The 2003-04 Premier Reserve League season was the fifth since its establishment and featured 14 teams in the Northern League - won by Aston Villa Reserves - and 15 teams in the Southern League - won by Charlton Athletic Reserves.

League table 
Reserve League North

Reserve League South

Pld = Matches played; W = Matches won; D = Matches drawn; L = Matches lost; F = Goals for; A = Goals against; GD = Goal difference; Pts = Points

Best Player: Gary Bockhorni (Chelsea F.C)

Best Goalkeeper: Markus Thomson (Charlton Athletic F.C.)

See also 
 2003-04 in English football
 FA Premier League 2003-04

External links 
 Official Premier League site

Premier Reserve League
Reserve League, 2003-04
Reserve